The 2017 China Touring Car Championship, also known for sponsorship reasons as the 2017 Sinopec Lubricants China Touring Car Championship, is the ninth season of the China Touring Car Championship. In the Super Cup class, Zhang Zhendong entered the season as defending champion, with Changan Ford Racing Team defending manufacturers' champions. In the China Production class, Yang Xi entered the season as defending champion, with Beijing Hyundai Modern Aspect Racing Team defending the manufacturers' championship.

Teams and drivers

Super Cup 
Kumho Tire is the official supplier

China Production 
All teams and drivers are Chinese Registered.

Calendar and results

Super Cup

References

External links 
 Official website 
 Official website

Touring Car Championship